Philippe Vandermaelen (1795–1869) was a Belgian geographer.

1795 births
1869 deaths
Belgian geographers
Belgian cartographers
Scientists from Brussels
Order of Leopold (Belgium)
Members of the Royal Academy of Belgium